Astrid Brousselle is a Canadian professor specializing in evaluation theories and methods in health and healthcare system analysis. Since 2017, she has been at the University of Victoria as a director and professor, in the School of Public Administration.

Early life and education 
Astrid Brousselle obtained a B.Sc. in economics, a M.Sc. in Health Administration, and a Ph.D. in public health (2002) from the University of Montreal with a specialization on evaluation theories and methods.

Career 
After obtaining her PhD, she completed a postdoc at McGill University, continuing to study evaluation theory. After this, she was appointed to an Assistant Professor position within the Department of Health Administration at the University of Montreal. She held a Canada Research Chair in Evaluation and Health Care System Improvement at University of Sherbrooke from 2011 to 2016. She also served as the vice-director of research for the Community Health Sciences Department and co-director of the Health: Population, Organizations, and Practices research group while at the University of Sherbrooke. Prior to joining the University of Victoria School of Public Administration in 2017, she spent 2013-2014 within the Faculty of Human and Social Development at that institution.

Astrid Brousselle has published over 80 scientific articles and in 2009 published a book in French titled L’Évaluation: Concepts et Méthodes, for which she has won two prizes. Her current research focuses on sustainability and equity within the healthcare system in response to a changing climate. She also often communicates with the general public and health care practitioners through interviews and op-eds, covering topics such as healthcare budgets, medicare in Quebec, public health, and climate action in British Columbia.

References

Year of birth missing (living people)
Living people
Academic staff of the Université de Sherbrooke
21st-century Canadian women scientists
Academic staff of the University of Victoria
Scientists from Quebec